Events from the year 2007 in Bhutan

Incumbents
 Monarch: Jigme Khesar Namgyel Wangchuck 
 Prime Minister: Khandu Wangchuk (until 31 July), Kinzang Dorji (starting 31 July)

Events

May

May 27: Nepalese police clash with Bhutanese asylum seekers at a United Nations resulting in one 16-year-old boy being killed and a dozen people being injured.

December
December 29: Singye Galeem film is released.

Deaths

References

 
Years of the 21st century in Bhutan
2000s in Bhutan
Bhutan
Bhutan